The Altopiano delle Murge (Italian for "Murge plateau") is a karst topographic plateau of rectangular shape in southern Italy. Most of it lies within Apulia and corresponds with the sub-region known as Murgia or Le Murge. The plateau lies mainly in the Metropolitan City of Bari and the province of Barletta-Andria-Trani, but extends into the provinces of Brindisi and Taranto to the south, and into Matera in Basilicata to the west. The name is believed to originate from the Latin murex, meaning "sharp stone".

Geography and geology
The Murge plateau covers a surface of some 4,000 km², bordered by the Ofanto river and the Tavoliere delle Puglie to the north, the Adriatic Sea to the northeast, and by the Messapic depression, which separates it from the Salento peninsula, to the south.  It is usually divided into Alta Murgia (High Murgia), the highest area, with poorer vegetation, and Bassa Murgia (Lower Murgia), with more fertile land, extensively planted with olive-trees for the production of olives.

The plateau is geologically homogeneous to a great extent, and lies mostly on the limestone formations of Calcare di Ban and Calcare di Altamura, with terra rossa deposits present in the sequence. The rocks are mostly Cretacic limestone, so that karst landscapes prevail in the area, with doline fields, some large dolines, sinkholes, and caves.  The largest dolines are near Altamura, Gravina, and Molfetta. The large karstic doline of Molfetta is known locally as the “Pulo”) and lies south-west of the town, near the Adriatic coast, taking the form of an oval-shaped depression with a depth of some thirty metres. Near Castellana Grotte are the Castellana Caves, the most important in the Apulia region. The highest point of the plateau is called Monte Caccia, at 679 m.

The climate is cold in winter, with average temperatures in the 1-6 °C range. In summer, they rise up to 30 °C. Rain, unlike in the arid Salento nearby, has an annual average of ca. 950 mm.

Economy
Historically, the Murge have been the seat of transhumance practice in animal husbandry, since at least the first millennium BC, with cattle being moved to Abruzzo in summer, and southwards during winter.

Until the 19th century, agriculture was characterized by large latifundia, owned by a few landowners, and the relative lack of water, forming part of a region sometimes called "the feudal South".
Present-day economic activities include marble quarries, and the production of olives, wine, almonds, cherries, and mulberries. The animals grazed include sheep, goats, domestic pigs, and cattle.

A local breed of horse, known as Murgese, has been bred here since the Middle Ages. In the 15th and 16th centuries, the breed was ridden by Italian knights. In later centuries, the Murgese almost died out, but was revived in the 1920s.

Tourism and small industries (such as construction materials and bottling) are also active.

See also 
 Pulo di Altamura
 Pulicchio di Gravina
 Gurio Lamanna
 Altamura
 Gravina in Puglia
 Alta Murgia National Park
 Lama (geology)
 Karst

References 

Landforms of Apulia
Plateaus of Italy